Charles Hazen Russell (July 11, 1845 Canton, St. Lawrence County, New York – March 1912) was an American lawyer and politician from New York.

Life
He was the son of Thomas Victor Russell (1817–1893) and Lucia Lavilla (Conkey) Russell. He attended Canton Academy and St. Lawrence University. Then he studied law in Philadelphia, was admitted to the bar 1877, and practiced in Brooklyn. On January 30, 1878, he married Stella Goodrich (1854–1901).

He was a member of the New York State Assembly (Kings Co., 9th D.) in 1880 and 1881.

He was a member of the New York State Senate (3rd D.) in 1882 and 1883.

He was a presidential elector in 1900, voting for William McKinley and Theodore Roosevelt.

In 1906, he married Annah Ayres Linquist. He died in March 1912, and was buried at the Green-Wood Cemetery in Brooklyn.

New York Attorney General Leslie W. Russell (1840–1903) was his first cousin. Rev. Samuel Russell (1660–1731) was his great-great-great-grandfather.

Sources
 Civil List and Constitutional History of the Colony and State of New York compiled by Edgar Albert Werner (1884; pp. 291 and 379f)
 Sketches of the Members of the Legislature in The Evening Journal Almanac (1883)
 Bio and genealogy transcribed from Genealogical and Family History of Northern New York by William Richard Cutter, at New York Roots
 Obituary Notes; Mrs. Charles H. Russell in NYT on February 13, 1901

External links
 

1845 births
1912 deaths
Republican Party New York (state) state senators
People from Canton, New York
People from Brooklyn
Republican Party members of the New York State Assembly
St. Lawrence University alumni
1900 United States presidential electors
Burials at Green-Wood Cemetery
19th-century American politicians